Between July 1927 and March 1928 the New South Wales Waratahs, the top Australian representative rugby union side of the time, conducted a world tour encompassing Ceylon, Britain, France and Canada on which they played five Tests and twenty-six minor tour matches.

The Queensland Rugby Union had collapsed in 1919 and would not be reborn until 1929 leaving the New South Wales Rugby Union to administer the game in Australia at the national representative level. Just prior to the start of the Australian 1927 season an invitation from the International Rugby Board arrived in Sydney requesting a New South Wales side tour Great Britain to play Tests against the Home Nations.

In 1986 the Australian Rugby Union decreed the five full-internationals played on the tour as official Test matches.

The squad and its captain

A squad of twenty-nine players was selected comprising twenty-eight New South Welshmen and one Queenslander in the great fly-half Tom Lawton, Snr who had been forced to come to Sydney to continue his career due to the absence of rugby in Brisbane. The side was captained by Arthur Cooper "Johnnie" Wallace who from Sydney University had earnt a Rhodes scholarship to Oxford in 1922 and whilst there had represented Scotland in nine Tests between 1923 and 1926.

The selection of Wallace as captain is referred to by Howell as "a masterstoke". He was well known in Britain through his Oxford and Scotland association, was an experienced and naturally gifted player, a strong tactician and a great influence on the younger players. On the nine-month tour, the Australians won 24, lost 5 and drew 2 of the matches they played and returned having established an international reputation for playing fair and attacking rugby.

Tour itinerary
The squad left Sydney by train on 22 July 1927 bound for Melbourne. They played a game on the afternoon of their arrival in Melbourne against a Victorian invitation XV which was won 19–9. They set off in the Ormonde from Melbourne on 26 July for Adelaide where they had a one-day stop.

By 10 August the Ormonde had arrived in Colombo where they were the guests of the Colombo Rugby Union and the tourists played that day against an All Ceylon XV in front of a crowd of 5,000 spectators. They set sail from Ceylon on 11 August. The Ormonde passed through the Suez Canal and the Straits of Messina and a disembarkation was made at Naples to enable a visit to Pompeii. Another stop was made at Toulon before arriving at Gibraltar on 28 August and Plymouth by month's end.

The squad had two weeks preparation on land at Teignmouth in Devon before the first tour match against Devon and Cornwall on 17 September. The tourists then relocated to Wales where matches were played at Newport, Swansea and Cardiff.

At Oxford the Waratahs suffered their first defeat 0–3 against a varsity side, although they won the next encounter against Cambridge. Matches were also played at Liverpool, Newcastle and Coventry before they sailed to Dublin. The Waratahs won the first Test of the tour 5–3 against Ireland at Lansdowne Road on 12 November.

Two weeks later the tourists met Wales at Cardiff Arms where they triumphed 18–8. From Cardiff they travelled to Scotland where matches were played at Glasgow, Melrose, Aberdeen and the Test loss at Edinburgh. The tourists made day trips to the Lochs, Lomond, Long and Gyll and where shown over the King's castle at Balmoral. Back in Edinburgh castles were visited by day with dinners and theatre parties attended at night.

The party travelled to London for New Year and were shown over the Houses of Parliament by Lord Donoughmore, the Secretary of the House of Lords and Sir James Whitley, the Speaker of the House of Commons. They were presented to the Prince of Wales at St James's Palace and to the King at Sandringham House. At Sandringham they accompanied the King through the woods on a shooting expedition after lunch and were presented to Her Majesty, Queen Mary at afternoon tea.

Later the Australians were flattered by a personal invitation to take tea at the Piccadilly residence of the Duke and Duchess of York where they met the infant Princess Elizabeth.

Two days after the Test loss at Twickenham the squad left for France, spending a night in Paris before journeying to Bordeaux. There against a selected provincial side the Waratahs suffered the most convincing defeat of the tour with the locals taking an early lead and holding on to a 19–10 victory. Then followed a match in Toulouse against a side representing south-western France in which the visitors prevailed.

Back in Paris, the tourists were entertained and shown the city's splendour before meeting the French national side at Stade Colombes in the final Test match of the tour in front of a crowd of 40,000 with 2,000 gendarmes stationed around the enclosure to keep in check the emotions of the enthusiasts. From Paris the squad crossed the channel and departed from Liverpool in the Melita for Canada. They travelled by train from coast to coast with stops at Montreal, Toronto, Banff and Sicamous. Arriving in Vancouver in late February 1928 the squad spent twelve days and played three exhibition matches against varsity and club sides.

In March 1928 they boarded the Aorangi in Vancouver to commence the final leg home with stops in Honolulu, Suva and Auckland before arriving in Sydney by month's end, a full nine months after first setting out.

Touring party
Manager: E.G. Shaw
Captain: Johnnie Wallace
Vice-Captain: Charles Fox

Squad

Matches of the tour
The "Exhibition Matches" are not classed as important as the "Tour matches". They are listed on the tour but the starting line-ups are not counted in the players stats.

 Test matches

Exhibition matches
Scores and results list New South Wales's points tally first.

Test matches

Ireland

Notes:
 Towers described the match as "an evenly contested and arduous struggle ...lacking the brilliance of the other internationals".
 The match would ultimately be recognised as the first ever Test between Ireland and an Australian side.

Wales

Scotland

Notes:
 "The playing area at Murrayfield had been covered throughout the week with straw as a protection against the inclemency of the weather and this covering was removed only just prior to the commencement of the match. The day was bitterly cold but notwithstanding this a crowd of 55,000 was present to witness the finest exhibition of the 15-a-side code that has been given for a number of years.
 The tactical keynote both in attack and defence of each of those evenly matched sides was speed. With 20 minutes left to play, both sides had scored two tries each, but the local side had converted twice, while the Waratahs had only been successful in this respect once. The spectators were mad with excitement during the last 10 minutes, as a NSW forward crossed the line twice but was recalled for infringements while the Waratah captain, after having beaten the opposition lost his footing on the partly frozen surface. A draw would have been a better ending to the game instead of the 10–8 victory for Scotland, as it dd not seem fitting that such an even and thrilling contest should be decided by a kick. It will suffice to say that the match will live long in the memory of those who witnessed as well as participated in it". (Towers)
 The match would ultimately be recognised as the first ever Test between Scotland and an Australian side.

England

Notes:

 England played with the wind at their backs in the first half and made all the running. A dash down the wing, a centring kick and the flanker J.S Tucker was over for a try which was converted 5–0 to England. Wallace made several breaks in the centre and then told Cyril Towers to loop outside him when he broke again. The move was executed brilliantly and with the conversion the scored were tied 5–5.(Zavos)
 "Up till half-time, the game had been fast and brilliant, with the Englishmen having a commanding lead of 10 points (15–5) at the interval. Soon after the change over, the locals increased their lead with another try and it was from then that the game reached such a height as a spectacle that it caused the press to place it in number-one position as the greatest game ever seen in England. Even champions of the past, great supporters of bygone games, conceded that the efforts of the Waratahs to make up a deficit of 13 points during the concluding 20 minutes was productive of the finest football imaginable".(Towers)
 The Waratahs showed their great fighting spirit by going into an extra-Waratah mode, attacking from everywhere, with John Ford, the massive number 8, taking the ball up time after time. Towers scored 18–8. Then the winger Eric Ford raced through the England defence 18–11. The Waratahs were still attacking the England line desperate to snatch the victory, when the full-time whistle blew. The crowd roared its appreciation of a great game of rugby, with the applause continuing long after the players had retired to the changing rooms and the hot tubs. (Zavos)

France

 "The game resulted in a Waratah victory and the standard of play was high, but the antics of the locals rather distracted us. The mere fact of having to conclude the match that day did not prevent some of the players from lying down for a spell when they were tired, or holding up the game to debate a point with the referee (who did not speak French) while a weep following on a hard tackle seemed to be part of their tactics".(Towers)
 The match would ultimately be recognised as the first ever Test between France and an Australian side.

Footnotes

References
 Collection (1995) Gordon Bray presents The Spirit of Rugby, Harper Collins Publishers Sydney
 Howell, Max (2005) Born to Lead – Wallaby Test Captains, Celebrity Books, Auckland NZ
 Spiro Zavos (2000) The Golden Wallabies, Penguin, Victoria

1927 rugby union tours
1928 rugby union tours
1927
1927
1927
1927
1927
1927
1927
1927
1927
1927 in Australian rugby union
1928 in Australian rugby union
1927 in Irish sport
1928 in Irish sport
1927–28 in English rugby union
1927–28 in Welsh rugby union
1927–28 in Scottish rugby union
1927–28 in French rugby union
1928 in Canadian rugby union